John Walter Denton Oliver (13 April 1918 in Crook, County Durham, England – 1973) was an international speedway rider who qualified for the Speedway World Championship finals three times.

Career summary
Oliver started speedway in 1945 and was given guidance and support from pre war rider Bob Harrison. In 1946 he joined the Belle Vue Aces. After an impressive first two seasons he was called up to race for England in the 1947-1948 Ashes test series in Australia.

In 1949 Oliver reached the first of his three World final appearances but in 1951 he announced his retirement. In 1951 he was tempted into riding again by the Bradford Tudors. Belle Vue signed him up again at the start of 1952 but he later rejoined the Tudors and remained there until he retired in 1954. He came out of retirement in 1956 to ride nine meetings for the Tudors but again retired.

In 1963, at the age of forty-five he returned to racing for the Sheffield Tigers in the Provincial League following a call from Frank Varey. He stayed there for two seasons until 1965 when the Belle Vue Aces used him for a few matches that season. He finally retired at the end of 1965 but remained on the staff at Belle Vue.

In 1973 Dent suffered a serious deterioration in his health and died in December.

World final appearances
 1949 -  London, Wembley Stadium - 16th - 0pts
 1950 -  London, Wembley Stadium - 11th - 6pts
 1953 -  London, Wembley Stadium - Res - 1pt

References

1918 births
1973 deaths
British speedway riders
English motorcycle racers
Belle Vue Aces riders
Bradford Tudors riders
Sheffield Tigers riders